"Ce fut en mai", or "Ce fu en mai", (It happened in May) is a French trouvère song, written in the 13th century by Moniot d'Arras. Its lyrics, in Old French, describe how a man sees a knight and a maiden cavorting in a garden. He follows them, and tells them of his unrequited love; they comfort him, and he cries and commends them to God. The song is a pastourelle and chanson, and was originally accompanied by dancing and medieval instruments like the vielle. "Ce fut en mai" has recently been recorded by early music performers such as Paul Hillier and the New Orleans Musica da Camera.

Background

The song was composed in 1235 by Moniot d'Arras, a monk at the Abbey of St. Vaast and one of the last trouvère musicians—these were poets from northern and central France who wrote in the langue d'oïl and worked in royal courts. Moniot himself was later patronised by Érard II, Count of Brienne. He also wrote religious poems honouring the Virgin Mary, but "Ce fut en mai" is his most famous work.

Lyrics
A love song, "Ce fut en mai" describes an unhappy lover who is comforted by religious feeling. It is a pastourelle, meaning it concerns the romance of a shepherdess. The song's narrative is written from the perspective of a man who, while playing beside a fountain on a morning in May, hears the sound of a fiddle. He sees a knight and a maiden dancing and embracing, and they leave to engage in sexual intercourse. The narrator hides and follows them, lamenting about how he has no such love. The knight notices him, and asks him what he wants; the narrator tells them of his unrequited love for a woman, to whom he is still faithful. The couple kindly console him, and tell him how they pray he will be happy. He thanks them sincerely, and commends them to God while crying.

Musical structure
"Ce fut en mai" is a chanson—a lyric-driven French song in the trouvere tradition. Its texture is monophonic, as it consists of a single melody. The use of instruments was improvised. The accompaniment was played on medieval instruments such as the psaltery, the dulcimer and the vielle. It is divided into five stanzas of 12 lines each, separated by short instrumental interludes. Each verses's musical form is "AABB". In the original Old French poem, each stanza has an "AAB AAB CCB CCB" rhyme scheme. However, the english translation above has a "AAB AAB CCD CCD" rhyme scheme. The music is cheerful, and does not reflect the sadness in the lyrics. In his book Music from the Earliest Notations to the Sixteenth Century, music historian Richard Taruskin called it "a consummate imitation folk song", and added: "There is little left here of the Latinate."

Performances
As a pastorelle, "Ce fut en mai" was originally accompanied by dancing and the music of a fiddle (vielle), as described in its lyrics. In recent years, the song has been recorded by many early music performers, including St George's Canzona, on their 1983 album Merry It is While Summer Lasts, the Folger Consort on A Medieval Tapestry: Instrumental and Vocal Music From the 12th Through 14th Centuries in 1990, and Paul Hillier on 2001's French Troubadour Songs. New Orleans Musica da Camera also released it in 2003 as part of The Songs of Arras, an album featuring the songs of Moniot d'Arras and Adam de la Halle.

The tune serves as the leitmotif of Saint Francis of Assisi in the ballet music Nobilissima Visione, written in 1937 by the German composer Paul Hindemith in collaboration with the Russian dancer and choreographer Léonide Massine. In the various scenes of the ballet the tune undergoes modifications reflecting the protagonist's changing attitude to what matters in life.

References

13th-century songs
French songs